CD2 may refer to:
 CD2, (cluster of differentiation 2), a cell adhesion molecule
 Chlordiazepoxide, by the trade name CD 2
 CD-2, Color Developing Agent 2 - color film developer, used in photographic processing of Kodachrome film and ECP processes.